Lepidochrysops evae is a butterfly in the family Lycaenidae. It is found in north-western Zambia.

Adults have been recorded in October.

The larvae possibly feed on Ocimum species.

Etymology
The species named for Eva Gardiner, wife of the author.

References

Butterflies described in 2003
Lepidochrysops
Endemic fauna of Zambia
Butterflies of Africa